A total lunar eclipse will take place on May 17, 2087. The moon will pass through the center of the Earth's shadow.

Visibility

Related lunar eclipses

Saros series

Inex series

Half-Saros cycle
A lunar eclipse will be preceded and followed by solar eclipses by 9 years and 5.5 days (a half saros). This lunar eclipse is related to two total solar eclipses of Solar Saros 139.

See also 
List of lunar eclipses and List of 21st-century lunar eclipses

Notes

External links 
 

2087-05
2087-05
2087 in science